Al-Shorija Sport Club, is an Iraqi football team based in Kirkuk, that plays in Iraq Division Two and Kurdistan Premier League.

Managerial history
 Ali Abdul-Qader

Honours

Domestic
Kurdistan Third Division League
Winners (1): 2013–14

References

External links
 Iraq Clubs- Foundation Dates

2003 establishments in Iraq
Association football clubs established in 2003
Football clubs in Kirkuk